Organoberyllium chemistry involves the synthesis and properties of organometallic compounds featuring the group 2 alkaline earth metal beryllium (Be). Beryllium is best known to have a +2 oxidation state and one of the smallest atoms and it is understudied in the periodic table. While metallic beryllium is relatively unreactive, its dust causes berylliosis and compounds are toxic. The Be2+ cation is characterized by the highest known charge density (Z/r = 6.45), making it one of the hardest cations and a very strong Lewis acid. It is most commonly used to coordinate other elements and can portray many types of compound through different ligands attachment. Coordination in beryllium can range from a coordination number of two to four. Most common ligands attached to beryllium are halides, hydride (like beryllium borohydride in a three-center two-electron bond), methyl, aryl, and alkyl. Beryllium can form complexes with known organic compounds such as phosphines, N-hetereocyclic carbenes (NHC), cyclic alkyl amino carbenes (CAAC), and β-diketiminates (NacNac). They can best be prepared by transmetallation or alkylation of beryllium chloride.

Characteristics 
Organoberyllium compounds consist of a beryllium atom with an organic group attached. Be has a +2 oxidation state, is one of smallest elements, and is understudied in the periodic table. There are very few reported case of Be(I) and Be(0) oxidation states. It has a higher charge density than any group 2 element. Organoberyllium chemistry is limited to academic research due to the cost and toxicity of beryllium. Organometallic beryllium compounds are highly reactive and strong acids. Beryllium has a high electronegativity compare to other group 2 elements; thus the resulting C-M bonds are less highly polarized and ionic-like. The lighter organoberyllium compounds are often considered covalent, but with some ionic bond characteristics owing to the attached carbon bearing a negative dipole moment. This higher ionic character and bond polarization tends to produce high coordination numbers and many compounds, particularly dialklys, are polymeric in solid or liquid states with highly complex structures in solution, though in the gaseous state they are often monomeric.

Compounds 
Beryllium can form a variety of organoberyllium compounds, including those that have ring structures, alkyls, alkynyls, hydrides, methyls, halides, phosphines, carbenes, and nitrogen-based coordination such as NacNac.

A good example of a beryllium compound is beryllium borohydride, which can contain a three-center two-electron bond and can produce dimers.

Compounds such as these hydrides can coordinate with carbenes such as N-heterocyclic carbene and can form crystals.  These compounds transform beryllium chemistry into many research avenues with coordination and perform organocatalytic characteristics.

Dimethylberyllium has the same crystal structure as dimethylmagnesium and can be used to synthesize beryllium azide and beryllium hydride.

Ring structure 
Organoberyllium structures can consist of an aryl, dineopentylberyllium, beryllocene, phenyl, or terphenyl. This structure can facilitate good coordination to other main group elements and even metal centers.

Halides 
Beryllium halides are formed by a combination of halogen with a beryllium atom. Beryllium halides are mostly covalent in nature except for the fluoride which is more ionic. They can be used as Lewis acid catalysts. Preparation for these compounds varies by the halogen. Beryllium halides are among the most common starting points to form complexes with other types of ligand. Halides can donate 2 electrons into the beryllium center with a charge of -1.

Phosphines 
Organoberyllium phosphines are another class of compounds that is used in synthesis. Phosphine donates two electrons into the beryllium center. Phosphines are L-type ligands. Unlike most metal ammine complexes, metal phosphine complexes tend to be lipophilic, displaying good solubility in organic solvents. Phosphine ligands are also π-acceptors. Their π-acidity arises from overlap of P-C σ* anti-bonding orbitals with filled metal orbitals. Beryllium can coordinate with a phosphine due to its good π-acceptor ability, which is used extensively in beryllium chemistry literature. An organoberyllium phosphine can be prepared through coordination with a beryllium halide to form a four-coordinate tetrahedral compound.

Carbenes 
An organoberyllium carbene consists of a carbene attached to beryllium. The types of carbene includes a N-heterocyclic carbenes (NHC) and cyclic alkyl amino carbenes (CAAC).

N-Hetereocyclic carbenes 
Beryllium can coordinate with an N-hetereocyclic carbene (NHC). NHCs are defined as heterocyclic species containing a carbene carbon and at least one nitrogen atom within the ring structure. NHCs have found numerous applications in some of the most important catalytic transformations in chemical industry, but their reactivity in coordinating with main group elements especially with beryllium’s potential as a reactive organocatalyst has opened new areas of research.

Cyclic alkyl amino carbenes (CAAC) 
Beryllium can coordinate with cyclic alkyl amino carbene (CAAC) ligands and can form beryllium radicals which can be present with beryllium complexes (BeR2). A CAAC ligand coordinates a 2 electron -1 charge into the beryllium center. CAAC has an "amino" substituent and an "alkyl" sp3 carbon atom. CAACs are very good σ donors (higher HOMO) and π acceptors (lower LUMO) compared to NHCs. In addition, the lower heteroatom stability of the carbene center in CAAC compared to NHC results in a lower ΔE.

β-Diketiminates (NacNac) 
β-Diketiminates (BDI, also known as NacNac), are a commonly used class of supporting ligands that have been successfully adopted to stabilize an extensive range of metal ions from the s, p, d, and f-blocks in multiple oxidation states. The popularity of these monoanionic N-donor ligands can be explained by their convenient access and high stereoelectronic coordination. This enables the separation of highly reactive coordinatively unsaturated complexes. Moreover, studies have demonstrated the utility of this class of ligands for designing active catalysts for various transformations. So, because of that, beryllium can properly coordinate with β-diketiminate compounds due to the high reactivity and stereo electronic coordination with the beryllium thus a Be NacNac compound is also common in organoberyllium chemistry.

Synthesis 
Synthesis of organoberyllium compounds is limited but literature have shown that beryllium can react with halides, alkyls, alloxides and other organic compounds. Alkylation of beryllium halide is one of the most widely-used method in beryllium chemistry.

Transmetallation 
A transmetallation involves a ligand transfer to one another such as this:

M'R2 + Be → BeR2 + M'

M is not limited to any main group and/or transition metal. R can be limited to almost any phosphine, aryl, alkyl, halogen, hydride and/or carbene.

In this case organoberyllium can form reactions such as:

Alkylation 

Alkylation of beryllium halide is another common method to react to make an organoberyllium compound such as this:

2 MR1 + BeR2 → BeR1 + MR2

M is not limited to any main group and/or transition metal. R1 is not limited to phenyl, methyl, methyl oxide, carbene etc. R2 can be any halide such as fluoride, bromide, iodide, or chloride.

An example of such reaction is the synthesis of bis(cyclopentadienyl)beryllium (Cp2Be) or beryllocene from BeCl2 and potassium cyclopentadienide:

2 K[Cp]+BeCl2 → (Cp)2Be + 2 KCl

Low oxidation beryllium chemistry 
While Be(II) is one of the more common oxidation states, there is also further research on a Be(I) and Be(0) complex. Low-valent main group compounds have recently become desirable synthetic targets due to their interesting reactivity comparable to transition metal complexes. In one work, stabilized cyclic (alkyl)(amino)carbene ligands were used to isolate and characterize the first neutral compounds containing beryllium, with the Be (0) compound stabilized by a strongly σ-donating and π-accepting cyclic CAAC ligand.

Be(I) is another example of a rare phenomenon and few publications were reported,  but one example of a Be(I) was a CAAC ligand already coordinated with Be. Gilliard and his group created a more stable beryllium radical cation. Because of well-established challenges concerning the reduction of Be(II) to Be(I), they pursued the radical via an oxidation strategy using TEMPO ((2,2,6,6-Tetramethylpiperidin-1-yl) oxyl). This reaction resulted in a Be(I) compound just by stabilizing the Be radical.

See also 
Group 2 organometallic chemistry
Beryllium

References 

Beryllium compounds
Organometallic chemistry